Minuscule 519 (in the Gregory-Aland numbering), ε 343 (in the Soden numbering), is a Greek minuscule manuscript of the New Testament, on parchment. Palaeographically it has been assigned to the 13th century. 
Scrivener labelled it by number 505. The manuscript is lacunose.

Description 

The codex contains the complete text of the four Gospels on 308 parchment leaves (size ) with only one lacuna (Matthew 16:2-17). The text is written in one column per page, 17-24 lines per page.

The is no another division according to the Ammonian Sections with references to the Eusebian Canons.

Text 

The Greek text of the codex is a representative of the Byzantine text-type. Hermann von Soden included it to the Kx group. Aland placed it in Category V.

According to the Claremont Profile Method it represents Kx in Luke 1 and Luke 20. In Luke 10 no profile was made.

History 

The manuscript was written by several hands. In 1727 the manuscript came from Constantinople to England and was presented to archbishop of Canterbury, William Wake, together with the manuscripts 73, 74, 506-520. Wake presented it to the Christ Church College in Oxford.

The manuscript was added to the list of New Testament minuscule manuscripts by F. H. A. Scrivener (505) and C. R. Gregory (519). Gregory saw it in 1883.

It is currently housed at the Christ Church (Wake 39) in Oxford.

See also 

 List of New Testament minuscules
 Biblical manuscript
 Textual criticism

References

Further reading

External links 

Greek New Testament minuscules
13th-century biblical manuscripts